Fani Palli-Petralia (born August 10, 1943) is a Greek lawyer, New Democracy politician and 
a former Minister for Employment and Social Protection. She is also a former Minister of Tourism, the first woman to hold this position.

Life
Born in Athens, she studied law at the University of Athens. She is married to Nikos Pallis and has three daughters and a son.

Political life
 She was elected MP for the Athens B constituency in the general elections of 1985, 1989 (June and November), 1990, 1993, 1996 and 2000.
 She was elected to the ND Central Committee in 1990 and the Executive Committee in 1997. In 1999, she became president of the European Women’s Union. In 2002, she was elected president of the International Democratic Union of Women.
 She served as Deputy Minister for Culture from 1990 to 1991 and Deputy Minister for Health, Welfare and Social Security from 1992 to 1993. She was Alternate Minister for Culture from 2004 to 2006. 
 She was appointed Minister for Tourism on 15 February 2006, and was not included in the Cabinet that was appointed after the September 2007 parliamentary election.
 On 18 December 2007, Palli-Petralia returned to the cabinet as Minister for Employment and Social Protection.

References

External links

1943 births
Living people
National and Kapodistrian University of Athens alumni
Greek MPs 1985–1989
Greek MPs 1989 (June–November)
Greek MPs 1989–1990
Greek MPs 1990–1993
Greek MPs 1993–1996
Greek MPs 1996–2000
Greek MPs 2000–2004
Greek MPs 2004–2007
Greek MPs 2007–2009
Politicians from Athens
New Democracy (Greece) politicians
Women government ministers of Greece
Labour ministers of Greece
20th-century Greek women politicians
21st-century Greek women politicians